Itavia was an Italian airline founded in 1958. During the 1960s it became one of the main private airlines of Italy, until its collapse in the early 1980s, following the destruction of Flight 870, also known as the Ustica disaster. Itavia was headquartered in Rome.

History
 
The airline was formed under the name of Società di Navigazione Aerea Itavia in 1958 and started domestic services a year later using de Havilland Dove and de Havilland DH.114 Heron aircraft. Operations were suspended in 1961, but resumed in 1962 under the name Aerolinee Itavia. The Herons were replaced in 1963 with the larger Handley Page Dart Herald, a pressurised turboprop liner. The Heralds remained in service until 1973.

Operations ceased again in 1965 and recommenced again in 1969 using Fokker F28 twin-jet airliners. In 1971 the Douglas DC-9-15 entered service.  Other DC-9 versions operated were the Douglas DC-9-21, Douglas DC-9-31, Douglas DC-9-33 and Douglas DC-9-51.  A total of 14 F28s and 11 DC-9s were used throughout its history.

Itavia operated a domestic network, which was again suspended in late 1980. Eventually, the airline was replaced by Aermediterranea, a subsidiary of Alitalia and ATI, in 1981.

Fleet

Various aircraft types were operated by Itavia over the years:

Incidents and accidents

On October 14, 1960, a De Havilland 114 Heron 2, registered as I-AOMU departed from Rome to Genoa, and crashed on mountain (Monte Capanne), in the Elba's Isle.  All 11 passengers and crew on board died.
On March 30, 1963, a DC-3, registered as I-TAVI departed from Pescara to Rome, and crashed on Monte Serra Alta, a mountain nearby Sora. All 8 passengers and crew on board died.
On January 1, 1974, a Fokker F28, registered as I-TIDE departed from Bologna to Turin, and crashed on approach to Turin Airport.  38 of the 42 people on board died.
On June 27, 1980, Itavia Flight 870, a Douglas DC-9-15 flying from Bologna to Palermo crashed in the Tyrrhenian Sea for reasons unclear, killing all 81 people on board. An explosion caused either by a bomb on board or an air-to-air missile is considered the most likely explanation.

References

External links

Itavia entry at Rzjets

 
Italian companies established in 1958
1981 disestablishments in Italy
Defunct airlines of Italy
Airlines established in 1958
Airlines disestablished in 1981